Asintado is a 2018 Philippine drama television series, directed by Onat Diaz, Lino S. Cayetano, and Trina N. Dayrit. The series stars Julia Montes as Ana Dimasalang, a paramedic who became Gael's nurse after saving him in an accident. She becomes entwined in an assassination plot arranged by the del Mundo's and Ojeda's upon witnessing their plan. The show features an ensemble cast consisting of Shaina Magdayao, Paulo Avelino, Aljur Abrenica, Lorna Tolentino, Agot Isidro, Nonie Buencamino, and Cherry Pie Picache. The series premiered on ABS-CBN's Kapamilya Gold afternoon block and worldwide on The Filipino Channel on January 15, 2018, replacing Pusong Ligaw.

As of October 5, 2018, 187 episodes of Asintado were aired over two seasons.

Series overview

Episodes

Season 1 (2018)

Season 2 (2018)

Notes

References

External links 
 

Asintado
Lists of Philippine drama television series episodes

Lists of soap opera episodes